M28 is a Ukrainian international highway (M-highway) in southern Ukraine that runs from Odesa to Yuzhne along the coast of Black Sea. Until 1 January 2013, the route was known as territorial road T-16-06.

Main route

Main route and connections to/intersections with other H-highways in Ukraine.

See also

 Roads in Ukraine
 Ukraine Highways

References

External links

Roads in Odesa Oblast
Roads in Ukraine